Tennis made its debut at the Commonwealth Games in 2010 in Delhi, India. Tennis has not been on the program since 2014.

Editions

Past Finals

Singles

Men

Women

Doubles

Men

Women

Mixed

All-time medal table
Updated after the 2014 Commonwealth Games

External links
Commonwealth Games sport index

 
Commonwealth Games
Sports at the Commonwealth Games